Northampton was one of the 16 original townships in Summit County, Ohio. It was in the middle of Summit County, bordering Akron and Cuyahoga Falls. No incorporated areas were formed within the township but Akron and Cuyahoga Falls expanded into Northampton via annexation. In 1986, Northampton Township merged with Cuyahoga Falls, the first time a township and city merged in Ohio. Its first settler, Simeon Prior named the township for the Hampshire County, Massachusetts village of Northampton.

Geography
Northampton was originally bounded by Portage Township on the south, Bath Township on the west, Boston Township to the north and Stow Township to the east.  At the time of its merger with Cuyahoga Falls it was bordered by Akron to the south, the city of Stow to the east and Cuyahoga Falls to the southeast.

History
The Ottawa and Mingo tribes hunted in Northampton before Europeans arrived.  (Grant, 1891).  The first white settler in Northampton was Simeon Prior, who moved there with his wife and ten children from Northampton, Massachusetts in 1802.  Native Americans still lived in the township and remained there until 1812 when American forces began to assemble there for the War of 1812.  Northampton provided a rendezvous point for militia during the war and the two (Grant, 1891) or three (Doyle, 1908) vessels of Oliver Hazard Perry's fleet were built in the township and floated down the Cuyahoga River to Lake Erie.

In 1986 Northampton merged with Cuyahoga Falls.  Both Akron and Cuyahoga Falls had been annexing the southern part of the township.  Also, a major portion of the township had been purchased by the Cuyahoga Valley National Recreation Area (now the Cuyahoga Valley National Park), reducing the tax base. The residents of Northampton chose to join with Cuyahoga Falls so that their future would be settled.  The township became Ward 8 in Cuyahoga Falls and kept special zoning to preserve some of its rural nature.

Annexation of parts of Northampton by Akron had left an irregular border between the two communities, including several islands inside Akron.  Akron and Cuyahoga Falls tried to work out a land swap to smooth out the borders.  They came up with a plan but it was never approved.  The two cities have a joint fire station, though, that covers part of both communities.

Counties
Northampton Township's land has been in the following counties: (Author unknown, 1999-2005)

1788 - Washington
1797 - Jefferson
1800 - Trumbull
1808 - Portage
1840 - Summit

Transportation
Northampton was served by Route 8, which originally went up Akron-Cleveland Road (now State Road).  With Route 8 being moved to a divided highway to the east, the area is no longer served by any state highways.

Schools
The area of Northampton is mostly served by the Woodridge Local School District, with parts also served by the Revere Local School District.  It is also served by the Cuyahoga Valley Joint Vocational School District.

Hamlets
 Botzum (Niles)
 East Steels Corners
 French's Mill (Doyle, 1908)
 Iron Bridge
 McArthur's Corners (Doyle, 1908)
 Northampton Center
 Old Portage
 West Steels Corners

References
 Author unknown, (1999-2005). County Formation Maps. Retrieved May 2, 2005.

 

Geography of Summit County, Ohio
Defunct townships in Ohio
Populated places disestablished in 1986